Work and Occupations is a peer-reviewed academic journal that publishes papers in the field of Industrial Relations. The journal's editor is Daniel B. Cornfield (Vanderbilt University). It has been in publication since 1974 and is currently published by SAGE Publications.

Scope 
Work and Occupations aims to provide a perspective on the dynamics of the workplace and to examine international approaches to work related issues. The journal is interdisciplinary and contains scholarship in areas such as gender and race relations, immigrant and migrant workers, and violence in the workplace.

Abstracting and indexing 
Work and Occupations is abstracted and indexed in, among other databases:  SCOPUS, and the Social Sciences Citation Index. According to the Journal Citation Reports, its 2017 impact factor is 2.276, ranking it 22 out of 146 journals in the category, ‘Sociology’, and 5 out of 27 journals in the category, ‘Industrial Relations & Labor’.

References

External links 
 

SAGE Publishing academic journals
English-language journals